Thomas Alvard (1460-1504) was a prominent merchant in Ipswich, Suffolk. He exported dairy products, grain, tanned leather and woollen cloth.

Family life
Thomas married Anne, daughter of John Rever, with whom he had  eight children. Their son, Thomas Alvard (1493-1535) became MP for Ipswich and was a servant of Cardinal Thomas Wolsey.

References

Businesspeople from Ipswich
Medieval English merchants
1460 births
1504 deaths